Māngere Lagoon is a lagoon in the Manukau Harbour, New Zealand. It occupies a volcanic crater or maar which is part of the Auckland volcanic field. Oval and about 600m long, it has a small restored scoria island remaining in the centre.

The lagoon, alongside Waitomokia, Crater Hill, Kohuora, Pukaki Lagoon and Robertson Hill, is one of the volcanic features collectively referred to as Nga Tapuwae a Mataoho ("The Sacred Footprints of Mataoho"), referring to the deity in Tāmaki Māori myths who was involved in their creation.

In the 1930s efforts were made to drain the swamp for conversion to pasture, while in the late 1950s, earthworks for sewage sludge ponds in the lagoon removed the scoria cone and the crater was divided into ponds. Public demand for a better sewage treatment system eventually led to a land-based facility, and in 2003, the restoration of the area to a tidal lagoon was completed, with the sludge removed. The scoria cone was rebuilt with an extra flat portion added on the west side as an artificial bird roost.

References

Volcanoes of Auckland: A Field Guide. Hayward, B.W.; Auckland University Press, 2019, 335 pp. .

External links
Photograph of Mangere Lagoon in 1959, held in Auckland Libraries' heritage collections.

Auckland volcanic field
Lagoons of New Zealand
Maars of New Zealand
Manukau Harbour
Landforms of the Auckland Region
Volcanoes of the Auckland Region
Māngere-Ōtāhuhu Local Board Area